The Virgin of the Valley (Spanish: Virgen del Valle or Nuestra Señora del Valle) is a Roman Catholic title of the Blessed Virgin Mary venerated in Margarita Island, Venezuela and Catamarca, Argentina.

In Venezuela, the Virgin is the Patroness of Eastern Venezuela, and her feast day is held on 8 September in her sanctuary in Margarita Valley near Porlamar. 

Pope Leo XIII granted a Canonical coronation towards the Argentinian image on 12 April 1891 while Pope Pius X crowned the Venezuelan image on 8 September 1911.

In Venezuela 

The Spanish conquerors brought the image of the Virgin Mary to Nueva Cádiz city in Cubagua Island. After a huge hurricane hit this island in 1542, the image was moved to El Valle del Espíritu Santo in Margarita Island whereby the virgin was rename as Virgin of the Valley. 

Miracles

Her holy mantle didn't abandon Margarita people. In 1541, the island was suffering a very hard drought so, the people decided to bring the Virgin in a procession. According to people believing, when they were in Asunción city a very heavy rain took place.

In Argentina 
 Catamarca
The center of the City of Catamarca boasts the imposing cathedral of Our Lady of the Valley, Patron Saint of the city. Throughout the year, thousands of faithful believers from all parts of the country flock to see the image of the virgin.

The spectacular temple of Our Lady of the Valley is the most important in the Province of Catamarca. It was designed by architect and town planner Luis Caravatti and constructed between 1859 and 1875 with a strong Neo-classical style. At that time, Vicario Seguro worked very hard to build this cathedral. In fact, he persuaded Justo Jose de Urquiza to make a donation of a sum of money for its construction. Certainly, many pilgrims also collaborated on the same purpose. The temple is so superb that not only does it attract the pilgrims but also the visitors to Catamarca, who cannot miss this architectural jewel. Its facade has a big entrance hall which extends towards the sidewalk and two side towers almost forty meters high.

Gallery

See also 
Venezuela
Isla Margarita
Mary, mother of Jesus

References

Catholic Church in Venezuela
Titles of Mary
Catholic holy days
Catholic devotions